Henry Colas may refer to:
Henry Colas (fl. 1377), English MP
Henry Colas (fl. 1393), English MP